Helcogramma billi is a species of triplefin blenny in the genus Helcogramma. It was described by Patricia E. Hadley Hansen in 1986, and the specific name honours the American ichthyologist Bill Smith-Vaniz, who collected the types Hadley Hansen examined when describing the species.

References

billi
Fish described in 1986